The Nashua School District is a school division serving the students of Nashua, New Hampshire. The current Superintendent of the district is Dr. Mario Andrade. As of 2020, the District Board of Education members are: Heather Raymond, Chair; Raymond Guarino, Clerk; Jennifer Bishop, Jessica Brown, Sharon Giglio, Paula Johnson, Dorothy Oden, Gloria Timmons, and Sandra Ziehm.

List of schools
The district currently has 18 schools serving grades K-12.

Elementary Schools
 Amherst Street Elementary School
 Bicentennial Elementary School
 Birch Hill Elementary School
 Broad Street Elementary School
 Charlotte Avenue Elementary School
 Dr. Norman W. Crisp Elementary School
 Fairgrounds Elementary School
 Ledge Street Elementary School
 Main Dunstable Elementary School
 Mount Pleasant Elementary School
 New Searles Elementary School
 Sunset Heights Elementary School

Middle Schools
 Elm Street Middle School
 Fairgrounds Middle School
 Pennichuck Middle School

High Schools
 Nashua High School North
 Nashua High School South

Other schools
 Brentwood Academy

References 

School districts in New Hampshire